In geometry, the snub dodecadodecahedron is a nonconvex uniform polyhedron, indexed as . It has 84 faces (60 triangles, 12 pentagons, and 12 pentagrams), 150 edges, and 60 vertices. It is given a Schläfli symbol  as a snub great dodecahedron.

Cartesian coordinates 
Cartesian coordinates for the vertices of a snub dodecadodecahedron are all the even permutations of
 (±2α, ±2, ±2β),
 (±(α+β/τ+τ), ±(-ατ+β+1/τ), ±(α/τ+βτ-1)),
 (±(-α/τ+βτ+1), ±(-α+β/τ-τ), ±(ατ+β-1/τ)),
 (±(-α/τ+βτ-1), ±(α-β/τ-τ), ±(ατ+β+1/τ)) and
 (±(α+β/τ-τ), ±(ατ-β+1/τ), ±(α/τ+βτ+1)),
with an even number of plus signs, where
 β = (α2/τ+τ)/(ατ−1/τ),
where τ = (1+)/2 is the golden mean and
α is the positive real root of τα4−α3+2α2−α−1/τ, or approximately 0.7964421.
Taking the odd permutations of the above coordinates with an odd number of plus signs gives another form, the enantiomorph of the other one.

Related polyhedra

Medial pentagonal hexecontahedron 

The medial pentagonal hexecontahedron is a nonconvex isohedral polyhedron. It is the dual of the snub dodecadodecahedron. It has 60 intersecting irregular pentagonal faces.

See also 
 List of uniform polyhedra
 Inverted snub dodecadodecahedron

References

External links 
 
 

Uniform polyhedra